Min Ryoung (born July 14, 1982 in Daegu) is a retired South Korean short track speed skater. He is the 2000 Overall World Champion.

2002 Winter Olympics

Min participated in the 2002 Winter Olympics held in Salt Lake City, Utah. Prior to the Olympics, he was expected to compete in the 1500 metre or 1000 metre individual events along with the 5000 metre relay. However, the South Korean coach controversially announced that he would send Min to only the relay event in order to give the opportunities of the individual competitions to another prospect Ahn Hyun-Soo.

On February 13, The South Korean relay team raced with United States, Italy, and Australia in the 45-lap semifinal race. During the 17th lap, Min attempted to pass United States team member Rusty Smith on the inside. But Min made a bad pass and bumped Smith's elbow and shoulder with his hip. Min collided with the Italian Nicola Rodigari, and the two fell on the ice and spun out into the boards. Min was sent to a hospital emergency room for evaluation for back and hip injuries. But the Korean team was disqualified.

Due to the injury, Min retired from short track speed skating for good next year.

References

External links
 

1982 births
Living people
South Korean male short track speed skaters
Olympic short track speed skaters of South Korea
Short track speed skaters at the 2002 Winter Olympics
Universiade medalists in short track speed skating
Sportspeople from Daegu
Universiade gold medalists for South Korea
Competitors at the 2001 Winter Universiade
21st-century South Korean people